United States Naval Forces Europe-Africa (CNE-CNA), is the United States Navy component command of the United States European Command and United States Africa Command. Prior to 2020, CNE-CNA was previously referred to as United States Naval Forces Europe – Naval Forces Africa (NAVEUR-NAVAF).

CNE-CNA provides overall command, operational control, and coordination of U.S. Naval Forces in the European and African Command area of responsibility.  As the Navy component in Europe, the commander of U.S. Naval Forces Europe-Africa, plans, conducts, and supports naval operations in the European theater during peacetime, contingencies, in general war and as tasked by Commander, U.S. European Command. NAVAF works with European, African, and South American governments, including in the disruption of militant networks, deterrence of illicit trafficking, and against piracy and maritime crime.

With its headquarters now at Naval Support Activity Naples, CNE-CNA directs all its naval operations through Commander, United States Sixth Fleet co-located in Naples, Italy, and support activities ashore through Commander, Navy Region Europe, Africa, and Southwest Asia (CNREURAFSWA), also headquartered in Naples.

Naval Forces Europe – Naval Forces Africa is commanded by Admiral Stuart B. Munsch, who also serves as NATO's Commander, Allied Joint Force Command Naples. The deputy commander is currently Vice Admiral Thomas Ishee, who concurrently serves as the Sixth Fleet commander.

History
The earliest presence of U.S. Navy forces in Europe was the Mediterranean Squadron, the European Squadron following the American Civil War, the forces were combined as part of the North Atlantic Fleet in 1906. In 1917, United States Naval Forces Operating in European Waters developed as a command under the leadership Admiral William S. Sims to oversee the European aspects of United States Navy operations during World War I.<ref>For Sims's own account, see William S. Sims The Victory at Sea (New York: Doubleday, 1920, rerinted Annapolis: Naval Institute, 1984))</ref> His principal subordinates were Rear Admirals Henry B. Wilson in France and Albert P. Niblack at Gibraltar.Michael Simpson, Anglo-American Naval Relations, 1917–1919. (London: Navy Records Society, 1991).

Following the cessation of hostilities and the Allied occupation of Turkey, Rear Admiral Mark L. Bristol was sent to Istanbul as Senior Naval Officer Turkey, commanding the U.S. Naval Detachment in Turkish Waters. In August 1919 Bristol also received the diplomatic appointment of U.S. High Commissioner, responsible to the State Department for diplomatic matters in Turkey. In his naval capacity Bristol was responsible to Commander, U.S. Naval Forces, European Waters. In September 1920, the flagship Pittsburg ran aground in the Baltic sea off Libau and returned to the United States for repairs. From January 1921 until April 1922, Vice Admiral Albert P. Niblack served as Commander, U.S. Naval Forces, European Waters. In October 1922, Pittsburgh returned to the Mediterranean and became flagship for two of Niblack's successors as Commander-in-Chief, U.S. Naval Forces European Waters, Admiral Philip Andrews in 1924–1925 and Vice-Admiral Roger Welles in 1925–1926.

At some point after 1926, Naval Forces, European Waters, went into abeyance. Later, in March 1942, the duties of the existing Special Naval Observer London were expanded to command naval forces. Commander, Naval Forces, Europe was established to maintain Navy bases in the United Kingdom and to report intelligence and research data being provided by Allied intelligence organizations. Numerous liaison channels were opened with the British Government and with governments in exile. The command also assisted in the planning and preparation of the invasions of North Africa and France. By 1944 the headquarters had been established at 20 Grosvenor Square, in central London. The building was only vacated by the Navy when the headquarters moved to Italy in 2009.

When Admiral Harold R. Stark became COMNAVEUR in April 1942, he was given the additional duties as Commander, United States Twelfth Fleet. The fleet, which operated in European waters, consisted of one battleship, two cruisers, an aircraft carrier and six destroyers.

By autumn of 1945, the chief function of the U.S. Navy in the occupied countries was completed; enemy naval forces had been disarmed, war material had been located and accounted for, and harbors had been reopened and were in operation. As operational emphasis changed and the geographical area expanded, the command's title was changed to more specifically define the Navy's role. In November 1946, COMNAVEUR became COMNELM (Commander, U.S. Naval Forces, Eastern Atlantic and Mediterranean) and six months later, in April 1947, the title was changed, this time to Commander in Chief, U.S. Naval Forces, Eastern Atlantic and Mediterranean (CINCNELM). A Northern European Force of five to six ships (cruisers and destroyers) were active from 1946 to 1956.Missouri visited Turkey amid the Turkish Straits crisis of 1946–48.

Admiral Robert B. Carney became CINCNELM in December 1950. In June 1951, he assumed additional duty as Commander-in-Chief, Allied Forces Southern Europe (CINCSOUTH), and the CINCNELM Headquarters was moved from London to Naples. In June 1952, the two commands were separated: CINCNELM Headquarters returned to London and Admiral Jerauld Wright became CINCNELM and Admiral Carney remained in Naples as CINCSOUTH.

Wright became the Commander-in-Chief effective 14 June 1952. CINCELM was organized into the following subordinate commands:"The Development of Unified Command Structure for the U. S. Armed Forces, 1945–1950," p. 11-21  in Ronald H. Cole, et al., The History of Unified Command 1946–1993 (Washington, DC: Joint History Office of the Office of the Chairman of the Joint Chiefs of Staff, 1995)
 Northern European Force (CTF 101) — Rear Admiral Robert B. Pirie, Chief of Staff to CINCNELM
 Fleet Air, Eastern Atlantic and Mediterranean (CTF-122) — Rear Admiral E.A. Cruise
 Military Sea Transport Service, Eastern Atlantic and Mediterranean (CTF-123) — Rear Admiral C.F. Chillingsworth
 U.S. Naval Forces, Germany (CTF-104) — Rear Admiral H.E. Orem
 Middle Eastern Force (CTF-109) — Rear Admiral Wallace M. Beakley
 U.S. Sixth Fleet — Vice Admiral J.H. Cassady

Wright's operational control over the Sixth Fleet proved to be a source of friction with Admiral Lord Louis Mountbatten, RN, NATO's Commander-in-Chief Allied Forces Mediterranean (CINCAFMED).  Mountbatten felt that the Sixth Fleet should be assigned to his command while Wright wanted to maintain control of the fleet, particularly its nuclear-armed aircraft carriers, pursuant to both U.S. Navy policy and the Atomic Energy Act of 1946. The dispute tested the diplomatic skills of both men.  CINCNELM forces participated in NATO Operation Mariner and Operation Weldfast exercises during 1953, and units of the Sixth Fleet did participate in NATO exercises while staying under U.S. control.

As CINCNELM, Wright maintained strong diplomatic ties with allies within his area of responsibility.  He made a 14-day goodwill trip to the Middle East that culminated with a courtesy call with the newly crowned King Saud bin Abdul Aziz in Jidda, Saudi Arabia. Later, Wright attended the coronation ceremonies of King Hussein of Jordan in May 1953.

In June 1953, Wright served as the senior U.S. Navy representative at the coronation pageant of Queen Elizabeth II, including flying his flag from the heavy cruiser USS Baltimore during the Coronation Naval Review of Spithead on 15 June.

Admiral Wright also made the arrangements for United States Ambassador to the United Kingdom Winthrop Aldrich to present a bronze plaque of John Paul Jones from the U.S. Naval Historical Center to the British government, initiating his long-time association with the famous naval hero of the American Revolution.

During a high-level conference in Washington, D.C. from 20 October – 4 November 1953, Wright was informed that that CINCNELM was to become a sub-ordinate command of the U.S. Atlantic Fleet reporting directly to Admiral Lynde D. McCormick, the Commander-in-Chief U.S. Atlantic Fleet (CINCLANTFLT).  Also, Wright would become the head of NATO's Eastern Atlantic Area, reporting to Admiral McCormick, the first Supreme Allied Commander Atlantic (SACLANT).

Admiral McCormick noted in his final fitness report dated March 1954:

VAdm. Wright has taken over the duty of the Subordinate Command with his usual vigor and ability.  This command being a new concept has required analytical adeptness and initiative which he had displayed to high degree.  VAdm. Wright is richly deserving of his imminent promotion to the positions which I now hold.

General Thomas T. Handy, the Deputy Commander-in-Chief, U.S. European Command, also noted:

Vice Admiral Wright has performed his task as CINCNELM with great distinction and has now been ordered to a new assignment as CINCLANT and NATO SACLANT.  A brilliantly qualified officer of strong and determined character.  One of the Navy's outstanding leaders.

Jeruald Wright was promoted to the rank of Admiral effective 1 April 1954.

In September 1958, Admiral James L. Holloway Jr., CINCNELM, was assigned additional duty as U.S. Commander Eastern Atlantic (USCOMEASTLANT). Under the Commander in Chief, U.S. Atlantic Fleet, USCOMEASTLANT provided intelligence and logistic support for LANTFLT units deployed in the USCOMEASTLANT area.

In February 1960, the title of the command was changed to Commander in Chief, U.S. Naval Forces, Europe (CINCUSNAVEUR) and the CINCNELM title was retained for command in the Middle East from Turkey and Egypt to the middle of the Indian Ocean. Although these were separate commands, they were placed under the control of one commander. The CINCNELM command was disestablished on 1 February 1964. During most of the intervening years, CINCUSNAVEUR has exercised direct command over four subordinate commanders: Commander, U.S. Sixth Fleet (COMSIXTHFLT); Commander, Fleet Air Mediterranean (COMFAIRMED); Commander, Middle East Force (COMIDEASTFOR) (until 1983); and Commander, U.S. Naval Activities, United Kingdom (COMNAVACT UK). After the Rapid Deployment Joint Task Force became United States Central Command, the Middle East Force was reassigned to the administrative command of Commander, U.S. Naval Forces Central Command (COMUSNAVCENT) on 1 October 1983.

CINCSOUTH and CINCUSNAVEUR again shared an Admiral when Admiral William J. Crowe Jr., who was CINCSOUTH, also took the title of CINCUSNAVEUR on 1 January 1983. Admiral Crowe retained his NATO command and headquarters in Naples, Italy. Vice Admiral Ronald J. Hays, in London, became Deputy CINCUSNAVEUR and retained the title of USCOMEASTLANT. The CINCUSNAVEUR Headquarters remained in London with Admiral Crowe spending time at both locations. The responsibility of U.S. Commander Eastern Atlantic was added to that of the Commander in Chief, Allied Forces, Southern Europe and Commander in Chief, U.S. Naval Forces, Europe on 28 February 1989 during Admiral James Buchanan Busey IV's assignment as Commander in Chief.

Post Cold War
In September 1996 it was agreed that CINCUSNAVEUR could support CINCLANTFLT forces without the USCOMEASTLANT designation.

In 1999, changes to CINCUSNAVEUR's area of responsibility were announced, after amendments to the Unified Command Plan. The United States Atlantic Command areas that had included the waters off Europe and the west coast of Africa were to be transferred to European Command. U.S. European Command already had responsibility for all U.S. land and air military planning in Europe and most of Africa. The change gave EUCOM, and NAVEUR, the responsibility for maritime planning in the same general area of operations. The changes were made effective on 1 October 2000. The Atlantic Command areas that presently include the waters off Europe and the west coast of Africa were also transferred to European Command.

In 2002, the command changed its name to Commander, U.S. Naval Forces, Europe (COMUSNAVEUR).

On 15 March 2004, NATO's Joint Force Command (JFC) Naples was activated and its predecessor command, Allied Forces Southern Europe was deactivated.

COMUSNAVEUR continues to be dual-hatted as COMJFC Naples. In August 2005 COMUSNAVEUR headquarters completed its relocation to Naples, Italy from London in the United Kingdom.  By a directive of 20 September 2005, Naval Forces Europe and Sixth Fleet were merged. NavEur is now co-located with his NATO headquarters. U.S. Naval Activities, United Kingdom was deactivated in September 2007.

USNAVEUR is now focusing more attention on Africa, specifically the Gulf of Guinea region, partially because of the increasing importance of the oil reserves there. Ships are now often deploying to aid regional African navies, of which the most important in the region is the Nigerian Navy. Connected with this effort, a new geographic combatant command, United States Africa Command, is being stood up and is scheduled for completion in September 2008, which may mean a realignment of USN responsibilities for the West African area. As a result, NAVEUR is now sometimes referred to as US Naval Forces Europe-Africa and even NAVAF. There is currently however no approved plan to establish a separate Naval Forces Africa HQ. Two new task groups are active, Commander Task Group 60.4 which runs the Africa Partnership Station deployment series, and Commander Task Group 60.5, the Southeast Africa Task Group.

The Commander, U.S. Naval Forces Europe-Commander, U.S. Naval Forces Africa (NAVEUR-NAVAF) area of responsibility (AOR) covers approximately half of the Atlantic Ocean, from the North Pole to Antarctica; as well as the Adriatic, Baltic, Barents, Black, Caspian, Mediterranean and North Seas. NAVEUR-NAVAF covers all of Russia, Europe and nearly the entire continent of Africa. It encompasses 105 countries with a combined population of more than one billion people and includes a landmass extending more than 14 million square miles.

The AOR covers more than 20 million square nautical miles of ocean, touches three continents and encompasses more than 67 percent of the Earth's coastline, 30 percent of its landmass, and nearly 40 percent of the world's population.

Commanders
For the Navy, flag officer tours are usually limited to two-years. This was laid out as official policy in 2006.

References

 CDR Doyle Quisenberry, USNR, TAR (Ret), "Navy Reservists Played Vital Role during Cold War and Desert Shield/Desert Storm," Surface SITREP, Surface Navy Association, Volume XXXII, No. 4, December 2016. "..Unlike the Pacific and Mediterrean Fleets, the U.S. Atlantic Fleet had
very limited overseas bases or supply depots and had to rely on host nation support and Navy Reservists to establish ALSS/FLSs to provide logistics support for afloat forces deployed to the North Atlantic theater. To offset this disparity, the U.S. Atlantic Fleet created the U.S. Commander Eastern Atlantic command which had a very small staff of Navy Reserve personnel in London, commingled with the CINCUSNAVEUR staff that was augmented and fleshed out by a considerable number of Navy Reservists that manned and commanded an Advanced Logistics Support Site (ALSS), a staging and receiving area for critical supplies bound for deployed fleet units; and to operate a Forward Logistics Site (FLS). The mission of the ALSS was to receive cargo from the U.S. by Air Mobility Command (AMC) common user aircraft and delivered the critical cargo and personnel by COD/VOD or Navy supply ships to the ships at sea."
 This article contains information from a U.S. Navy web site and is in the public domain''.

External links
 Official website
 United States Navy, Official Commander of Naval Forces Europe Twitter page
 United States Navy, Official Commander of Naval Forces Africa Twitter page
 United States Navy, Official Commander of Naval Forces Europe Facebook page

Commands of the United States Navy